André Capet (30 November 1939 – 31 December 2000) was a French politician for the Socialist Party, who served as a member of the National Assembly between 1993 and 1997; and 1997 to his death in 2000, representing the Pas-de-Calais's 7th constituency. His son Yann Capet represented the same seat between 2012 and 2017.

References 

1939 births
2000 deaths
Living people
People from Calais
People from Pas-de-Calais
Socialist Party (France) politicians
Politicians from Hauts-de-France
Deputies of the 9th National Assembly of the French Fifth Republic
Deputies of the 11th National Assembly of the French Fifth Republic
Members of Parliament for Pas-de-Calais
20th-century French politicians
21st-century French politicians

Deaths from epilepsy